Kamwandu is a town in the Kasai-Central province of the Democratic Republic of the Congo.

Transport 

It is served by a station on the national railway network.

See also 

 Railway stations in DRCongo

References 

Populated places in Kasaï-Central